Richard O'Donoghue (born 1970/71) is an Irish Independent politician who has been a Teachta Dála (TD) for the Limerick County constituency since the 2020 general election.

Political career
O'Donoghue is a self-employed building contractor.

He first stood for election in the 2009 local elections, when he was an unsuccessful Fianna Fáil candidate for Limerick County Council. At the 2014 local elections, he won a seat on the new Limerick City and County Council, but he left Fianna Fáil in December 2015 and sat as independent.

At the 2016 general election, O'Donoghue stood as an independent candidate in the Limerick County constituency. He won only 6.4% of the first-preference votes, and was not elected.

At the 2019 local elections, he was re-elected to the council, as an independent. At the 2020 general election, he won a seat in Dáil Éireann, ousting the sitting Fine Gael TD Tom Neville. He is the first independent TD to represent the Limerick County constituency. His brother, John O'Donoghue was co-opted to Richard O'Donoghue's seat on Limerick City and County Council following his election to the Dáil.

In 2020, it was reported that O'Donoghue had expressed concern over the speed of development of the COVID-19 vaccines and was quoted as saying that "at the moment I would not like to take it". However, he subsequently said that this was a misunderstanding, and that he was only temporarily unable to have the vaccination because of ongoing medical treatment but would have the vaccination once this was completed. He also asserted that a video circulating on the internet purportedly showing him to be anti-vaccination was faked.

Personal life
O'Donoghue is married and has four children. He lives in the village of Granagh, County Limerick.

References

Year of birth uncertain
1970s births
Living people
Members of the 33rd Dáil
Independent TDs
Fianna Fáil politicians
Local councillors in County Limerick